Kockelella is an extinct genus of conodonts in the family Kockelellidae from the Silurian.

References

External links 

 
 Kockelella at fossilworks.org (retrieved 30 April 2016)

Ozarkodinida genera
Silurian conodonts
Paleozoic life of Ontario